Lieutenant-Colonel Sir Walter Dorling Smiles CIE DSO DL (8 November 1883 – 31 January 1953) was a Northern Irish politician.

Sir Walter was the son of William Holmes Smiles, director of Belfast Ropeworks, and grandson of Samuel Smiles. Sir Walter served during the First World War and, in the 1920s, managed a tea estate in Assam, there he became involved in local government and was a member of the Assam Legislative Council.

During the First World War; he obtained a pilots certificate but due to the lack of aircraft he transferred to Royal Naval Armoured Car Division. In 1915 he joined the British Armoured Car Expeditionary Force which was seconded to the Imperial Russian Army to fight against Turkish forces in the Caucasus Campaign. In 1918 he had reached the rank of lieutenant commander and was highly decorated; he received the DSO in 1916, with bar in 1917 and a MID, along with Russian and Romanian decorations; such as the St George of the 4th class.
 
He was Conservative Member of Parliament (MP) for Blackburn from 1931 to 1945. Smiles was re-elected in 1935 but stood for Down in Northern Ireland at the 1945 Westminster election, as a Unionist. The two-seat constituency was split in 1950 into North Down and South Down. He was succeeded by his daughter, Patricia Ford. He is the great-grandfather of explorer Bear Grylls.

References

External links 
 

1883 births
1953 deaths
Conservative Party (UK) MPs for English constituencies
Members of the Parliament of the United Kingdom for County Down constituencies (since 1922)
UK MPs 1931–1935
UK MPs 1935–1945
UK MPs 1945–1950
UK MPs 1950–1951
Knights Bachelor
Royal Navy personnel of World War I
Companions of the Distinguished Service Order
Companions of the Order of the Indian Empire
People educated at Rossall School
Politics of Blackburn with Darwen
Deaths due to shipwreck at sea
Accidental deaths in Northern Ireland
Ulster Unionist Party members of the House of Commons of the United Kingdom